Wolsztyn   is a town in western Poland, on the western edge of Greater Poland Voivodeship. It is the seat of Wolsztyn County, and of the smaller administrative district of Gmina Wolsztyn.

Geography 

The municipal area includes a large lake (Wolsztyn Lake), next to which is a palace built in Classical style in the early 20th century, now used as a hotel and restaurant, and a park. Nearby tourist destinations include the Pszczew Landscape Park and the Przemęt Landscape Park.

History 

The current settlement was established about 1285 on a causeway across the swampy Dojca River, probably by Cistercian monks descending from Obra Abbey. It developed as a centre of wool trade and cloth manufacturing on the road from Poznań to Lusatia, vested with market rights in 1424. Wolsztyn's town privileges were confirmed in 1519. It was a private town of Polish nobility, administratively located in the Kościan County in the Poznań Voivodeship in the Greater Poland Province of the Polish Crown. A route connecting Warsaw and Poznań with Dresden ran through the town in the 18th century and King Augustus III of Poland often traveled that route.

It was annexed by Prussia in the course of the Second Partition of Poland in 1793. In 1807 it was regained by Poles and included within the short-lived Polish Duchy of Warsaw, and after its dissolution in 1815 it was reannexed by Prussia. With the Prussian Province of Posen it became part of the German Empire in 1871 and a target of the Germanisation policies carried out by the German Eastern Marches Society (Hakata). After World War I, in November 1918, Poland regained independence as the Second Polish Republic, and the town returned to Poland several weeks later, when it was captured by Polish insurgents on January 5, 1919 during the Greater Poland Uprising.

With the 1939 Invasion of Poland, which started World War II, the town was occupied by Germany on 7 September 1939 and directly incorporated into the Nazi German Reichsgau Wartheland until the end of the war in 1945. The Polish population was subjected to various crimes, including arrests, expulsions and deportations to Nazi concentration camps. The Germans established and operated the Stalag XXI C/H prisoner-of-war camp for Polish, French, British, Italian, American and Norwegian POWs in the present-day district of Komorowo, a Nazi prison, and a forced labour camp for Jews. Notable Polish sculptor and painter Marcin Rożek, who lived and worked in Wolsztyn, was arrested by the Germans and then imprisoned in the Fort VII in Poznań and the Auschwitz concentration camp, where he died in 1944.

From 1975 to 1998 it was administratively located in the Zielona Góra Voivodeship.

Sights
The town has a Baroque parish church of the Immaculate Conception dating from the 18th century, a historical palace of the Gajewski and Mycielski noble families, which now houses a hotel, with an adjacent park, as well as several museums.

Locomotive depot 

The railway line from Wolsztyn to Zbąszyń opened in 1886. The locomotive roundhouse in Wolsztyn is the last place in Europe to supply standard gauge steam locomotives for regular, timetabled train services on the national railway network. As of Summer 2020 these services run to Leszno and Poznań. The site also includes a railway museum featuring restored locomotives.

Since 1993 the Polish State Railways organises an annual parade of locomotives, which  takes place at the start of May. The 2007 event, which also celebrated the roundhouse's centenary, attracted about 20,000 visitors.

Sport 
The town is best known for its handball team KPR Wolsztyniak Wolsztyn. The local association football team is Grom Wolsztyn.

Major corporations 
 Inter Groclin Auto SA Wolsztyn + Grodzisk Wielkopolski

International relations

Twin towns — Sister cities
Wolsztyn is twinned with:
   (Germany)
   (France)
   (Netherlands)
   (Germany)
   (Germany)

Notable people 

 Bruno Asch (1890–1940) — politician (SPD) and last mayor of Höchst am Main, Germany
 Heinrich Graetz (1817–1891) — Jewish historian, attended yeshiva in Wolsztyn from 1831-1836.
 Max Samuel Grifenhagen — Sheriff of New York County 1913–16, present day Borough of Manhattan; his father, Benjamin William Grifenhagen, was born in Wolsztyn)
 Józef Maria Hoene-Wroński (1776–1853) — Polish mathematician known for the Wronskian determinant, philosopher, lawyer, participant of the Kościuszko Uprising
 Hans Jürgen Kallmann (1908–1991) — German painter
 Robert Koch (1843–1910) — German microbiologist known for Koch's postulates, worked as public health officer in Wolsztyn from 1872 to 1880
 Robert Kubaczyk (born 1986) — Polish athlete
 Hans von Kusserow (1911−2001) — German artist
 Ingeborg von Kusserow (born 1917) — German actress
 Stanisław Piosik (born 1946) — Polish politician
 William Rosenau (1865–1943) — rabbi
 Marcin Rożek (1885–1944) — Polish sculptor and painter, killed in the Auschwitz concentration camp
 Adam Skórnicki (born 1976) — winner of the 2008 Individual Speedway Polish Championship

References

External links 
 The Wolsztyn Experience, a society for the preservation of steam railways in Poland
 Gallery of images of Wolsztyn locomotive roundhouse
 The Roundhouse Wolsztyn site

Media links 

 EchaRegionu.pl, news and information

Cities and towns in Greater Poland Voivodeship
Wolsztyn County
Poznań Voivodeship (1921–1939)
13th-century establishments in Poland
Populated places established in the 1280s